The 2019 Thindown Challenger Biella was a professional tennis tournament played on outdoor red clay courts. It was part of the 2019 ATP Challenger Tour. It took place in Biella, Italy between 16 and 22 September 2019.

Singles main-draw entrants

Seeds

 Rankings are as of 9 September 2019.

Other entrants
The following players received wildcards into the singles main draw:
  Federico Arnaboldi
  Matteo Arnaldi
  Giacomo Dambrosi
  Gabriele Felline
  Pietro Rondoni

The following player received entry into the singles main draw using a protected ranking:
  Daniel Muñoz de la Nava

The following players received entry from the qualifying draw:
  Oscar José Gutierrez
  Fernando Romboli

Champions

Singles

 Gianluca Mager def.  Paolo Lorenzi 6–0, 6–7(4–7), 7–5.

Doubles

 Tomislav Brkić /  Ante Pavić def.  Ariel Behar /  Andrey Golubev 7–6(7–2), 6–4.

References

2019 ATP Challenger Tour
Tennis tournaments in Italy
2019 in Italian sport
September 2019 sports events in Italy